William E. Kuusisto (April 26, 1918 – May 28, 1973) was a guard in the National Football League (NFL) who played for the Green Bay Packers.  Kuusisto played collegiate ball for the University of Minnesota and the University of Wisconsin before being drafted by the Green Bay Packers in the 8th round of the 1941 NFL Draft.  He played professionally for six seasons and retired in 1946. Kuusisto was also a professional wrestler.

Kuusisto died of a heart attack in Paynesville, Minnesota in 1973.

References

External links
 Bill Kuusisto, G at NFL.com

1918 births
1973 deaths
American football guards
Green Bay Packers players
Minnesota Golden Gophers football players
Wisconsin Badgers football players
People from Baraga County, Michigan
Players of American football from Michigan
American people of Finnish descent
Roosevelt High School (Minnesota) alumni